The Battle of Singara was fought in 344 between Roman and Sasanian Persian forces. The Romans were led in person by Emperor Constantius II, while the Persian army was led by King Shapur II of Persia. It is the only one of the nine pitched battles recorded to have been fought in a war of over twenty years, marked primarily by indecisive siege warfare, of which any details have been preserved. Although the Persian forces prevailed on the battlefield, both sides suffered heavy casualties.

Background
When Shapur II, who ascended to the throne of the Sasanian Empire in 309 (at the time an unborn infant), came of age and took in hand the administration of his kingdom, he dedicated himself to a lifelong mission of restoring his country's military power, and avenging its recent defeats by the Romans and Saracens. After thoroughly subduing the Lakhmid Arabs rebellion in the south, he directed his attention towards Rome, his main enemy, in 337. The sacking of a Sasanian city and the deportation of its population may have led to the intervention of Shapur II. He began by recapturing Armenia. and then advanced in his first campaign against Constantius II in the following year, however, the Roman defensive lines resisted and the Persian forces made limited progress.

Battle

The Roman troops initially retreated and broke into the Persian camp. They inflicted heavy casualties including Shapur's son Prince Narseh. However, the Persians counter-attacked and drove the Romans away with heavy losses.

Outcome and aftermath
The death of Shapur's son did not facilitate an amicable settlement of the conflict, and the war dragged on for several years. Shapur, notwithstanding the extent of his victory, proved unable to utilize the event to any further advantage. Two years later, he became bogged down in another siege of Nisibis, but was then obliged to break off the war to meet the threat of nomadic barbarian invasions in Sogdiana in the far east. The war resumed in 359 CE, but ended with no conclusive result. In 363 it was taken up energetically by Julian, who was successful but died during the campaign. After his death, the Roman army suffered a decisive defeat. His successor, Jovian, was forced to cede extensive Roman territory in the treaty of Dura, and thus Shapur's ambitions were accomplished.

See also
 Perso-Roman wars of 337–361
 Siege of Amida

Notes

References

4th-century conflicts
Singara
Singara
Singara
340s in the Roman Empire
4th century in Iran
History of Mesopotamia
Constantinian dynasty
344
Shapur II
Constantius II